The following is a list of episodes of the Waccha PriMagi! anime television series. The opening and ending themes for season one are "Dreaming Sound" and "Magical Future".

Notes

References

Waccha PriMagi!